Manuel de Jesús Jiménez Oreamuno  (June 16, 1854 – February 25, 1916) was a Costa Rican politician and author. He was born in Cartago, Costa Rica, and died in Alajuela, Costa Rica. He was the son of Jesús Jiménez Zamora, the President of the Republic from 1863 to 1866 and from 1868 to 1872, and of Esmeralda Oreamuno Gutiérrez. He married Clemencia Rojas Román.

He studied at the College San Luis Gonzaga of Cartago, where he was later a professor of history, geography, and literature.

He was President of the Municipal of Cartago (1883–1885), Representative of Cartago (1886–1888 and 1892) and Secretary of Exterior Relations (1888–1889).

As a well-known figure of Costa Rican liberalism, he was a candidate for the Presidency of the Republic in the 1894 elections. Later, he was the Secretary of the Treasury (1902–1904), Manager of Business and Consul General of Costa Rica in El Salvador (1904–1906). During the administration of his brother, Ricardo Jiménez Oreamuno (1910–1914) he was First Designate of the Presidency and also Representative of Cartago.

He was distinguished as a historian because he wrote various chronicles regarding the colony and Costa Rica of the past, and he also excelled as an author of descriptions of customs, and as an orator.

As a writer he principally worked on historical subjects, in short stories. His works were collected in two volumes titled "News of the Past". Between those volumes he wrote the book, "Careers of San Juan".

He collaborated with Monsignor Victor Sanabria Martínez, second Archbishop of San José, Costa Rica in his work "Genealogy of Cartago from 1650 until 1850", managing to prove a profound knowledge of the collection of protocols of the National Archive of Costa Rica, and contributing important elements to the understanding of the studied lineage in said work.

Vice presidents of Costa Rica
1854 births
1916 deaths
People from Cartago Province
Foreign ministers of Costa Rica